A Choice of Weapons: Inspired by Gordon Parks is a 2021 documentary film that follows the life of the photographer and filmmaker Gordon Parks. Its title derives from Parks’ 1967 autobiography. The film features Devin Allen, Jelani Cobb, Anderson Cooper, Ava DuVernay, Nelson George, Jamel Shabazz, Spike Lee, and LaToya Ruby Frazier.

It was directed and produced by John Maggio for HBO Documentary Films; Alicia Keys and Swizz Beatz served as executive producers. The film had its world premiere at the Tribeca Film Festival on June 18, 2021.

Reception
On review aggregator website Rotten Tomatoes, the film has an approval rating of 86% based on 7 critics, with an average rating of 7.3/10.

Matt Fagerholm of RogerEbert.com gave the documentary four stars and called it "deeply moving". Chris Barsanti of Slant Magazine gave it 3 stars out of 4 and called the film "[a] workmanlike in presentation but scintillating in its content".

References

External links
 

2021 documentary films
2021 films
American documentary films
Documentary films about photographers
Documentary films about film directors and producers
HBO documentary films
2020s English-language films
2020s American films